Nattasha Singh is an Indian actress who started her career as a child, in the sitcom serial Dekh Bhai Dekh. She played Kirti, the bubbly talkative emotional daughter of Navin Nischol and Farida Jalal.

Following a four-year hiatus from acting, she has made her Bollywood debut as main lead in the movie Mission 11 July, which was released on 15 January 2010. She plays Raavi, a girl deeply in love with her boyfriend Shahid, but no matter how much she loves him, she refuses to stand by him when he turns to terrorism.

Personal life
Nattasha was born on 8 December. She lives with her family in Mumbai. She is the daughter of music composer and singer Ajit Singh and numerologist Gittanjali Singh. Her sister Tanya Singh is also an actress and is married to T-Series owner Krishna Kumar.

Television career

Film career

References 

Indian film actresses
Living people
Actresses in Hindi cinema
Indian television actresses
1992 births